Preston College is a further education college in the city of Preston, Lancashire, England.  The college originally opened as W. R. Tuson College in September 1974 and was renamed Preston College on 1 September 1989.

Campus
The college had two main sites until mid-2011; the main campus on St. Vincent's Road in Fulwood and a smaller building located next to Moor Park. The college finished the build of a Btec building in mid-2011 upon the Fulwood campus; the replaced the Moor Park campus.

A £5m visual and performing arts centre was opened on the Fulwood site in January 2012.

Courses
The college primarily provides education in vocational subjects, but academic courses at a sixth form college level can also be undertaken.

Alumni
During the 1980s, British Comedian Lenny Henry re-took his O Levels at the college whilst appearing in a summer comedy show in Blackpool.

Rebecca Atkinson studied theatre and dance at the college. MP Ashley Dalton studied at the college.

References

External links
 Preston College

Education in Preston
Buildings and structures in Preston
Further education colleges in Lancashire
Educational institutions established in 1974
1974 establishments in England